In Greek mythology, Chrysorthe (Ancient Greek: Χρυσόρθη) was a Sicyonian princess as the daughter of King Orthopolis, descendant of the city's founder Apis. By Apollo, she became the mother of Coronus who succeeded her father in the throne of Sicyon.

Note

References 

 Pausanias, Description of Greece with an English Translation by W.H.S. Jones, Litt.D., and H.A. Ormerod, M.A., in 4 Volumes. Cambridge, MA, Harvard University Press; London, William Heinemann Ltd. 1918. . Online version at the Perseus Digital Library
 Pausanias, Graeciae Descriptio. 3 vols. Leipzig, Teubner. 1903. Greek text available at the Perseus Digital Library.

Princesses in Greek mythology
Women of Apollo
Mortal parents of demigods in classical mythology
Sicyonian characters in Greek mythology